Maret Merisaar (born 13 February 1958 in Tallinn) is an Estonian biologist and politician. She has been member of XI Riigikogu.

She is a member of Estonian Greens.

References

1958 births
Living people
Estonian biologists
Estonian Greens politicians
Members of the Riigikogu, 2007–2011
Women members of the Riigikogu
University of Tartu alumni
People from Tallinn
21st-century Estonian women politicians